"Worst Case Scenario" is the third single by the English indie band The Hoosiers from their 2007 #1 album The Trick to Life. It has been admitted by lead man Irwin on the band's website that it is one of the band's favourite songs.

History
The song received its first airplay on Radio 1 and the single was released 7 January 2008. However, it made a surprisingly disappointing impact in the UK Singles Chart. After The Hoosiers had already had two UK Top 5 singles, this single was to miss the UK Top 75 altogether, only peaking just outside that area at #76. However, the single's release also boosted The Trick to Life back into the UK Top 5 in the UK Albums Chart on 27 January 2008.

The video shows the band playing in a dark wooden cabin where things aren't as they seem.

The song is about being in love with being miserable.

Chart positions

Track listing
Worst Case Scenario
Ruby Blue

References

The Hoosiers songs
2007 songs
2008 singles
RCA Records singles
Song articles with missing songwriters